Robert Lester Stallman was an American literary critic, English professor and science fiction writer, author of the Book of the Beast trilogy. He wrote under the name of Robert L. Stallman in his academic writings, and Robert Stallman for his fiction.

Biography
Stallman was born in Kankakee, Illinois, the son of Otto John Melvin Stallman and Martha Elizabeth (Lester) Stallman. His father worked as a grainer in a bed factory. Stallman was raised in the vicinity of Kankakee. He served in the US Army from September 16, 1952 to September 7, 1954.

Stallman received a bachelor's degree in English in 1957  and a master's degree in English in 1961, both from the University of New Mexico, and a Ph.D. from the University of Oregon in 1966. He worked as a professor of English at Western Michigan University in Kalamazoo, Michigan, and was an authority on William Morris, as witness his doctoral thesis The Quest of William Morris (Eugene, Oregon: University of Oregon Press, 1966). and various articles published in professional journals.

Stallman died in Kalamazoo.

Literary career
Stallman's literary reputation is founded on his Book of the Beast trilogy, written late in life and published in part posthumously. According to Peter Nicholls the work is "an engrossing series" of "complex, sensitively written Fabulations, fitting between the generic borders of sf and Horror, and update the myth of the Werewolf with [an] sf premise." He finds the final volume "awkwardly structured," however, judging it "needed a auctorial revision which it could not be given" due to Stallman's premature death.

Bibliography

Book of the Beast trilogy
The Orphan (1980)
The Captive (1981)
The Beast (1982)

Nonfiction
The Quest of William Morris (Eugene, Oregon: University of Oregon Press, 1966).
"On Not Talking: An Experience in Teaching Poetry" in College English v. 36, no. 1 (Sep. 1974), pp. 32–39.
"The Lovers' Progress: An Investigation of William Morris' 'The Defence of Guenevere' and 'King Arthur's Tomb'" in SEL: Studies in English Literature 1500–1900 v. 15, no. 4 (Autumn 1975), pp. 657–70.
"Poetry without Fear" in The Journal of Aesthetic Education v. 12, no. 3 (July 1978), pp. 23–32.
"Rapunzel Unravelled" in Victorian Poetry v. 7, no. 3 (Autumn 1979), pp. 221–32.

Awards
Stallman was nominated two years running for the John W. Campbell Award for Best New Writer, placing fifth for the 1981 award and second for the 1982 award. His first novel The Orphan was nominated for the 1981 Nebula Award for Best Novel and the 1981 Balrog Award for Best Novel, as well as placing second in the 1981 Locus Poll Award for Best First Novel and seventeenth in the 1981 Locus Poll Award for Best Fantasy Novel. Its sequel, The Captive, placed fifth in the 1982 Locus Poll Award for Best Fantasy Novel.

References 

1930 births
1980 deaths
20th-century American novelists
American male novelists
Novelists from Illinois
American speculative fiction writers
University of New Mexico alumni
University of Oregon alumni
Western Michigan University faculty
People from Kankakee, Illinois
20th-century American male writers